Whitman station is an MBTA Commuter Rail station in Whitman, Massachusetts. It serves the Plymouth/Kingston Line. It is located off South Avenue (MA 27). Parking is available on the south side of South Avenue on both sides of the tracks. The station opened along with the rest of the Old Colony Lines on September 26, 1997.

A three-stall engine house was located at Whitman until the late 1940s. The foundations were uncovered and turned into a park during the MBTA station construction. The former station building was destroyed by arson around 1971.

References

External links

MBTA - Whitman
Station from South Avenue from Google Maps Street View

MBTA Commuter Rail stations in Plymouth County, Massachusetts
Railway stations in the United States opened in 1997